Flancourt-Crescy-en-Roumois (literally Flancourt-Crescy in Roumois) is a commune in the department of Eure, northern France. The municipality was established on 1 January 2016 by merger of the former communes of Bosc-Bénard-Crescy, Épreville-en-Roumois and Flancourt-Catelon.

See also 
Communes of the Eure department

References 

Communes of Eure
Populated places established in 2016
2016 establishments in France